The R235 road is a regional road in Ireland, located in east County Donegal. It runs from Castlefin to the border. On the Northern Ireland side, the road continues to Castlederg, County Tyrone.

References

Regional roads in the Republic of Ireland
Roads in County Donegal